"Courtesy of the Red, White and Blue (The Angry American)" is a song written and recorded by American country music artist Toby Keith. The song was written in late 2001, and was inspired by Keith's father's death in March 2001, as well as the September 11, 2001 attacks on the United States later that year. It was released in May 2002 as the lead single from the album, Unleashed.  The song topped the Billboard Hot Country Singles & Tracks chart and reached number 25 on the Billboard Hot 100 chart, becoming his biggest solo hit on that chart.

Background
The reaction was so strong that the Commandant of the Marine Corps James L. Jones told Keith it was his duty as an American citizen to record the song. "It's your job as an entertainer to lift the morale of the troops," Jones said to Keith. "If you want to serve, that is what you can do." 

In a November 2003 interview with CBS, Keith gave his take on the song: "It wasn't written for everybody. And when you write something from your heart – I had a dad that was a veteran, taught me how precious our freedom is – I was so angry when we were attacked here on American soil that it leaked out of me. You know, some people wept when they heard it. Some people got goose bumps. Some people were emotionally moved. Some cheered, turned their fists in the air."

Controversy
ABC invited Keith to sing "Courtesy of the Red, White, and Blue" on a patriotic special it produced in 2002; however, the host of the show, Canadian-born newsman Peter Jennings, requested Keith soften the lyrics of the song or choose another song to sing. Keith refused both requests and did not appear on the special. The rift gave the song a considerable amount of publicity, which led to many national interviews and public performances of the song. During an interview with 60 Minutes, Keith spoke about his public comments about Jennings, saying "I thought it was hilarious. My statement was, 'Isn't he Canadian?' to a bunch of press. They laughed and then I said, 'Well, I bet Dan Rather wouldn't kick me off his show,'" says Keith." Responding to criticisms of the network decision, a representative for ABC stated that because Keith was performing in Utah when the show would broadcast, Keith could be on the program only as the opening act, and that the song was "angry" and "not the kind of tone the producers wanted to use to begin this three-hour celebration."

Keith had a public feud with the Dixie Chicks over both the song and comments they made about President George W. Bush. The lead singer of the Dixie Chicks, Natalie Maines, publicly stated that the song was "ignorant, and it makes country music sound ignorant." Keith responded by belittling Maines' songwriting skills, and by displaying a backdrop at his concerts showing a doctored photo of Maines with Saddam Hussein. On May 21, 2003, Maines wore a T-shirt with the letters "FUTK" on the front at the Academy of Country Music Awards. While a spokesperson for the Dixie Chicks said that the acronym stood for "Friends United in Truth and Kindness", many, including host Vince Gill, took it to be an obscene shot at Keith and understood the acronym to mean "Fuck You Toby Keith". In August 2003, Keith publicly declared he was "all done feuding with Natalie Maines 'cause I guess there's more important things than that to concentrate on".

Maines later agreed that the FUTK shirt was directed at Keith. In the 2006 documentary Dixie Chicks: Shut Up and Sing, backstage footage prior to her appearance wearing the F.U.T.K. shirt recorded the conversation between Maines and Simon Renshaw and confirmed that the original intent of the shirt was in response to Keith's public criticism of her: the letters stood for "Fuck You Toby Keith".

Commercial performance
"Courtesy of the Red, White and Blue (The Angry American)" debuted at number 41 on the U.S. Billboard Hot Country Songs for the week of May 25, 2002.  The album was certified Gold by the RIAA on January 3, 2006, and platinum on March 27, 2012. The song has sold 1,607,000 digital copies in the U.S. as of July 2019.

Charts and certifications

Weekly chart

Year-end charts

Certifications

References

2002 singles
2002 songs
American patriotic songs
DreamWorks Records singles
music about the September 11 attacks
music videos directed by Michael Salomon
song recordings produced by James Stroud
songs about the United States
songs written by Toby Keith
Toby Keith songs
Songs of the Iraq War